Nyctixalus is a genus of frogs in the family Rhacophoridae. The common name is Indonesian tree frogs. They can be found in the Malay Peninsula, Sumatra, Java, Borneo, the Philippines, and southern Vietnam. Nyctixalus is the sister taxon of Theloderma. It has also been considered subgenus of Theloderma, but the most recent research treat it as a distinct genus.

Description
Nyctixalus are medium-sized frogs with adults being  in snout–vent length. Their body and limbs have numerous spiny tubercles. Fingers are free or webbed at base. Vocal sac is always absent.

Species
There are three species in the genus:
 Nyctixalus margaritifer Boulenger, 1882
 Nyctixalus pictus (Peters, 1871)
 Nyctixalus spinosus (Taylor, 1920)

References

 
Rhacophoridae
Amphibians of Asia
Amphibian genera
Taxa named by George Albert Boulenger